Longtan District is a district of Jilin City, Jilin, People's Republic of China.

Administrative Divisions
Subdistricts:
Zunyi Subdistrict, Longtan Subdistrict, Xin'an Subdistrict, Longhua Subdistrict, Hanyang Subdistrict, Baoziyan Subdistrict, Kaoshan Subdistrict, Shanqian Subdistrict, New Jilin Subdistrict, Tuchengzi Subdistrict, Tiedong Subdistrict, Yushu Subdistrict

The only town is Wulajie Manchu Ethnic Town

Townships:
Jinzhu Township, Jiangbei Township, Longtan Township

References

External links

Jilin City
County-level divisions of Jilin